Matheus Alves Leandro (born 19 May 1993) is a Brazilian professional footballer who plays for Malaysia Super League club Negeri Sembilan as a forward.

After making a first appearance in Thai League 1 against Suphanburi FC, Matheus made a first hat trick on Toyota League cup game vs Muangthong United on 11 July 2018.

Club Career 
In 2022 he joined the team Negeri Sembilan FC on a free transfer. Has been with the team for one year and has become a key player throughout 2022. He has helped the team secure fourth place in the Malaysia Super League in 2022. It is an impressive achievement as the team has just been promoted from the Malaysia Premier League in the previous year and had shocked the other Malaysia Super League teams because Negeri Sembilan FC was considered an underdog team. He has made 20 appearances and scored 6 goals during his time with Negeri Sembilan FC.

Career statistics

References

External links

1993 births
Living people
Brazilian footballers
Brazilian expatriate footballers
Fluminense FC players
FC Istres players
FC Lahti players
Gangwon FC players
Suwon FC players
Sri Pahang FC players
Matheus Alves
Matheus Alves
Matheus Alves
Chungnam Asan FC players
Negeri Sembilan FC players
Ligue 2 players
Championnat National players
K League 2 players
Veikkausliiga players
Expatriate footballers in France
Brazilian expatriate sportspeople in France
Expatriate footballers in Finland
Brazilian expatriate sportspeople in Finland
Expatriate footballers in South Korea
Brazilian expatriate sportspeople in South Korea
Expatriate footballers in Malaysia
Brazilian expatriate sportspeople in Malaysia
Association football midfielders